The following highways are numbered 298:

Canada
 Quebec Route 298

Japan
 Japan National Route 298

United States
  Arkansas Highway 298
  Florida State Road 298
  Florida State Road 298A (former)
  Georgia State Route 298
  Kentucky Route 298
  Maryland Route 298
  Minnesota State Highway 298
  Montana Secondary Highway 298
  New York State Route 298
 New York State Route 298 (former)
  Ohio State Route 298 (former)
  South Dakota Highway 298 (former)
  Tennessee State Route 298
  Texas State Highway 298 (former proposed)
  Texas State Highway Spur 298
  Farm to Market Road 298
  Urban Road 298 (signed as Farm to Market Road 298)
  Utah State Route 298
  Virginia State Route 298